Alberto Labarthe (31 March 1928 – 18 November 2021) was a Chilean sprinter. He competed in the men's 100 metres at the 1948 Summer Olympics. Labarthe died in November 2021, at the age of 93.

Competition record

References

External links
 

1928 births
2021 deaths
Athletes (track and field) at the 1948 Summer Olympics
Chilean male sprinters
Olympic athletes of Chile
Sportspeople from Santiago
20th-century Chilean people